Halometasone is a potent (Group III) synthetic tri-halogenated corticosteroid for topical application possessing pronounced anti-inflammatory, antiexudative, antiepidermoplastic, antiallergic, and antipruritic properties. It has been approved in many European countries including Spain, Germany, Switzerland, Austria, Netherlands, Belgium, and Portugal and other regions such as China, Hong Kong, Turkey, Israel, South Africa and India.

It has been used to treat chronic psoriasis vulgaris and non-infected acute eczematous dermatoses (eczema). One study demonstrated that 0.05% halometasone cream was more effective than 0.05% betamethasone cream in treating dermatitis, though both were well tolerated, with no systemic adverse effects reported.

References 

Corticosteroids
Organochlorides
Organofluorides